Ailuroglossum is a genus of flowering plants belonging to the family Boraginaceae.

Its native range is Southern Central China.

Species:

Ailuroglossum breviglochidiatum 
Ailuroglossum triste

References

Boraginaceae
Boraginaceae genera